Richard Stuart Howitt (born 5 April 1961) is a British Labour Party politician, and a former Chief Executive Officer of the International Integrated Reporting Council. For five years prior to becoming CEO of the IIRC, he acted as a voluntary IIRC Ambassador, promoting Integrated Reporting within the policy and business communities. He took over from the previous CEO Paul Druckman. He was Member of the European Parliament (MEP) for 22 years between 1994 and 2016.

Background
Howitt was born in Reading, Berkshire.  He was brought up in a single-parent family, in a council house, and went to a comprehensive school. He graduated with a BA degree in  Politics, Philosophy and Economics from Lady Margaret Hall, Oxford in 1982 and has a Postgraduate Diploma in Management Studies from the University of Hertfordshire.

After leaving university, he worked for four years in the voluntary sector and eight years for a disability organisation.

Political activity
Howitt served as a councillor on Harlow District Council from 1983 to 1995, including three years as Leader of the council. Here he spearheaded some groundbreaking work assessing local government's environmental impact.  He was the Labour Party candidate in Billericay in the 1987 general election.

Howitt was elected as an MEP to the European Parliament, representing the Essex South constituency, and served for the East of England constituency from 1999 to 2016.

Howitt is a key architect of the EU's non-financial information directive, one of the biggest transformations in corporate disclosure anywhere in the world. He was rapporteur on corporate reporting-related issues, including social responsibility, for many years. On this topic he has been described as a "trailblazer".

As lead-MEP on corporate responsibility, Mr Howitt has represented the EU on many missions worldwide, travelling extensively in Asia, Africa and the Americas. He has represented European interests in numerous international initiatives, including the UN Business and Human Rights Forum and the OECD Forum on Responsible Business Conduct.

Howitt helped to negotiate a £22 million European Union fund to help finance food banks in the UK, but in 2013 the UK government refused to accept the funds.  Howitt stated:

Howitt was a member of the Labour Party's National Policy Forum between 1994 and 2016. He supported Owen Smith in the 2016 Labour Party leadership election.

In September 2016, Howitt announced his resignation from the European Parliament to become chief executive of the International Integrated Reporting Council. The Labour candidate next on the party list from the 2014 European Elections, Alex Mayer, replaced him as MEP.

In May 2021, he was elected as a member of Cambridgeshire County Council.

References

External links

Official website
Profile at European Parliament website
HOWITT, Richard Stuart, Who's Who 2013, A & C Black, 2013; online edn, Oxford University Press, Dec 2012

1961 births
Living people
Alumni of Lady Margaret Hall, Oxford
Alumni of the University of Hertfordshire
Labour Party (UK) MEPs
MEPs for England 1994–1999
MEPs for England 1999–2004
MEPs for England 2004–2009
MEPs for England 2009–2014
MEPs for England 2014–2019
Labour Party (UK) parliamentary candidates
Labour Party (UK) councillors
Councillors in Essex
Members of Cambridgeshire County Council
Leaders of local authorities of England